The Fad Gadget Singles is the 1986 collection of singles by British musician Fad Gadget.  The album versions of these songs are not only of differing lengths, they were also often alternative mixes.  The songs span the career of Fad Gadget from "Back to Nature" / "The Box" (his first single, double A side) to "One Man's Meat", his final single before Fad Gadget reverted to his given name of Frank Tovey for the remainder of his recording career (he toured with Depeche Mode under the persona of Fad Gadget once again, only a few months before his death of a heart attack on 3 April 2002.)

"Back to Nature" / "The Box" was the second single ever to be released on Mute Records in October 1979.  One b-side, "4M" from the "Life on the Line" single, is included on the collection.

Track listing
 "Back to Nature" 5:44
 "The Box" 4:14
 "Ricky's Hand" 4:06
 "Fireside Favourite" 4:07
 "Insecticide" 3:04
 "Lady Shave" 5:41
 "Saturday Night Special" 4:31
 "King of the Flies" 3:05
 "Life on the Line" 3:54
 "4M" 3:00
 "For Whom the Bells Toll" 3:31
 "Love Parasite" 3:16
 "I Discover Love" 3:43
 "Collapsing New People" 4:08
 "One Man's Meat" 3:22

Footnotes

Fad Gadget albums
1986 compilation albums
Mute Records compilation albums